Gerald Melzer was the defending champion but chose not to defend his title.

Alexander Bublik won the title after defeating Nicolás Jarry 7–6(7–5), 6–4 in the final.

Seeds

Draw

Finals

Top half

Bottom half

References
Main Draw
Qualifying Draw

Morelos Open - Singles
Morelos Open